Pikelot Island is one of the outer islands of the State of Yap, part of the Federated States of Micronesia. It is a low coral islet, with a wet, tropical climate. It is uninhabited.

Flora and fauna
The island is known to have a rich ecosystem, with forest and scrub; and extensive fringing reefs. The islet is also home to a major seabird rookery, turtle nesting area and a few mangroves.

Inhabitants

The islet has no permanent inhabitants, but because of the beautiful wildlife, there are often temporary visitors from surrounding atolls such as Puluwat and Satawal on turtle hunting expeditions. The trip to Pikelot is still carried out in Micronesian style sailing outrigger canoes.

History
The first recorded European sighting was by Spanish naval officer Juan Antonio de Ibargoitia commanding the vessel Filipino in 1801.

On 2 August 2020, three missing sailors were found on the island. After being lost for three days, their SOS sign, assembled with palm branches laid out on the beach, was spotted by a KC-135 Stratotanker aircraft operated by members of the Hawaii and Pennsylvania Air National Guards, who had departed from Andersen Air Force Base, Guam to search for the missing vessel and its crew. The airmen then radioed their position to an Australian ship in the area.

See also

 Desert island
 List of islands

References

External links
 Island Directory, United Nations Environment Programme (UNEP)

Islands of Yap
Uninhabited islands of the Federated States of Micronesia